A Minister of State in Ireland (also called a junior minister) is of non-cabinet rank attached to one or more Departments of State of the Government of Ireland and assists the Minister of the Government responsible for that Department.

Appointment
Unlike senior government ministers, which are appointed by the President of Ireland on the advice of the Taoiseach and the prior approval of Dáil Éireann, Ministers of State are appointed directly by the government, on the nomination of the Taoiseach. Members of either House of the Oireachtas (Dáil or Seanad) may be appointed to be a Minister of State at a Department of State; to date, the only Senator appointed as Minister of State has been Pippa Hackett, who was appointed in June 2020 to the 32nd Government of Ireland. Ministers of State continue in office after the dissolution of the Dáil until the appointment of a new Taoiseach. If the Taoiseach resigns from office, a Minister of State is also deemed to have resigned from office.

Powers and duties of a Government Minister may be delegated to a Minister of State by a statutory instrument. If the Government Minister resigns, these powers must delegated again on the appointment of a new Government Minister. Some Ministers of State are  department heads. In the 31st Government, Leo Varadkar was the Minister for Defence as well as Taoiseach but the day-to-day running of the Department of Defence was administered by Paul Kehoe, the Minister of State at the Department of Defence.

History
The Ministers and Secretaries Act 1924 allowed the Executive Council (from 1937, the Government of Ireland) to appoint up to seven Parliamentary Secretaries to the Executive Council or to Executive Ministers, who held office during the duration of the government and while they were a member of the Oireachtas. This position was abolished by the Ministers and Secretaries (Amendment) (No. 2) Act 1977, which created the new position of Minister of State. This Act was commenced on 1 January 1978.

In the 1977 Act, the number of Ministers of State was limited to 10. In 1980 this was raised to 15, in 1995 it was raised to 17, and in 2007 it was raised to 20. On 21 April 2009, Brian Cowen asked all 20 Ministers of State to resign, and he re-appointed a reduced number of 15 ministers the following day, when the Dáil resumed after the Easter recess. The current government appointed 20 Ministers of State in July 2020.

Máire Geoghegan-Quinn was the first woman to be appointed as a Parliamentary Secretary, when she was appointed as Parliamentary Secretary to the Minister for Industry and Commerce by Jack Lynch in 1977 (becoming Minister of State at the Department of Industry, Commerce and Energy in 1978). In 1979, Geoghegan-Quinn would become the first women appointed to cabinet since 1921.

Ministers of State attending cabinet
The Government Chief Whip is a Minister of State at the Department of the Taoiseach and attends cabinet. The current Chief Whip is Hildegarde Naughton.

Since the Rainbow Coalition formed in 1994, several governments have appointed additional Ministers of State with permission to attend cabinet but not to vote. Ministers of State attending cabinet, other than the Chief Whip, are often described as super junior ministers or super juniors. Up to three Ministers of State attending cabinet may receive an allowance. Ministers of State attending cabinet in the 33rd Government are:
Hildegarde Naughton – Minister of State at the Department of the Taoiseach
Jack Chambers – Minister of State at the Department of Transport, and at the Department of the Environment, Climate and Communications, at the Department of Tourism, Culture, Arts, Gaeltacht, Sport and Media
Pippa Hackett – Minister of State at the Department of Agriculture, Food and the Marine

References

 
Politics of the Republic of Ireland